Crema Dania or Crema Danica is a double cream cheese from Denmark. It has an edible, downy white rind and a soft, buttery, full-flavoured interior. Its fat content is almost high enough for the cheese to qualify as triple cream, so it is quite rich.

See also
 List of cheeses

References 

Danish cheeses
Cow's-milk cheeses